Big Fence was a secret navigational aid for US Army Air Force sorties from North Africa and Italy during World War II, ultimately located at the Castel del Monte in Apulia. It was operated by the 6649th Navigational Aids Squadron of the 341st Signal Company, XV Fighter Command, 15th Army Air Force.

The 6649th supported missions critically reliant on fixing the position of aircraft.  Answering call sign "Big Fence", the central plotting room inside the castle triangulated information from seven direction finding installations, including the Castel headquarters.

From September 1943 until cessation of hostilities, the squadron received an estimated 16,000 calls for assistance from lost, damaged, and air-sea rescue craft.
 
 

 

 

Being a VHF system, Big Fence was particularly valuable to fighters, which only had VHF radios.  The bombardment groups could often rely on other navigational aids that were at their disposal, but only VHF remained effective in bad weather.

References

North African campaign
Italian campaign (World War II)
Air navigation